Pandit Jia Lal Dhar Saraf was a prominent personality of Reshipeer mohalla in Srinagar, Kashmir. He was a renowned Sanskrit scholar with great proficiency in astrology. He authored many religious texts. He also translated many Sanskrit literary works into Kashmiri. One of his most prolific works is the translation of Panchastavi into Kashmiri.

He had a melodious voice. Sh. Saraf used to go to Hari Parbat every Saturday evening, reciting and singing bhajans and leelas the whole night in praise of Mata Sharika.

He managed his family business, which was run under the title of M/s H.R. Jia Lal and Co. He was the owner of hotel 'Naya Kashmir Hotel' which is right across the Clock Tower (ghantaghar) in Lal Chowk, Srinagar.

External links
ikashmir.net
youtube.com
koshur.org
autarmota.blogspot.com

Indian Sanskrit scholars